L with bar (capital Ƚ, lower case ƚ) is a Latin letter L with a bar diacritic. It appears in the alphabet of the Venetian language, and in its capital form it is used in the Saanich orthography created by Dave Elliott in 1978.

In Unicode, both the capital and lower case are in the Latin Extended-B block.

See also
Bar (diacritic)
Ł (similar letter)

References

Latin-script letters